Khatra subdivision is a subdivision of the Bankura district in the state of West Bengal, India.

History
Khatra subdivision was established as an additional subdivision on 27 March 1986 and as a full-fledged subdivision on 2 November 1992

Geography
Khatra subdivision is geologically located in the erosional eastern part of Chota Nagpur plateau. Mashak Hill is the highest point in this subdivision. Kangsabati and Shilabati are two prominent river in this subdivision.

Subdivisions in the district
Bankura district is divided into the following administrative subdivisions:

Khatra subdivision has a density of population of 434 per km2. 29.07% of the population of the district resides in this subdivision.

Administrative units
Khatra subdivision has 9 police stations, 8 community development blocks, 8 panchayat samitis, 59 gram panchayats, 1,311 inhabited villages, 4 census towns. The census towns are: Khatra, Ledisol, Simlapal and Raipur Bazar. The subdivision has its headquarters at Khatra.

Police stations
Police stations in Khatra subdivision have the following features and jurisdiction:

Blocks
Community development blocks in Khatra subdivision are:

Gram Panchayats
The subdivision contains 59 gram panchayats under eight community development blocs:

Khatra block: Baidyanathpur, Dhanarah, Khatra Gram–I, Supur, Dahala, Gorabari and Khatra Gram–II. 
Indpur block: Brahmandiha, Gaurbazar, Indpur, Veduasol, Brojarajpur, Hatgram and Raghunathpur.
Hirbandh block: Baharamuri, Hirbandh, Moshiara, Gopalpur and Maliyan.
Raipur: Dhanarah, Fulkusma, Motgoda, Sonagara, Dheko, Melera, Raipur, Dundar, Mondalkuli and Shyamsundarpur.  
Sarenga block: Bikrampur, Gargarla, Neturpur, Chiltore, Goalbari and Sarenga.
Ranibandh block: Ambikanagar, Haludkanali, Rajakata, Rautora, Barikul, Puddi, Ranibandh and Rudra.
Simlapal block: Bikrampur, Lakshmisagar, Mondalgram, Simlapal, Dubrajpur, Machatora and Parswala.
Taldangra block: Amdangra, Harmasra, Saltora, Bibarda, Khalgram, Satmauli, Fulmati, Panchmura and Taldangra.

Education
Bankura district had a literacy rate of 70.26%  as per the provisional figures of the census of India 2011. Bankura Sadar subdivision had a literacy rate of 69.56%, Khatra subdivision 69.79% and Bishnupur subdivision 71.60%.  

Given in the table below (data in numbers) is a comprehensive picture of the education scenario in Bankura district for the year 2013–14. It may be noted that primary schools include junior basic schools; middle schools, high schools and higher secondary schools include madrasahs; technical schools include junior technical schools, junior government polytechnics, industrial technical institutes, industrial training centres, nursing training institutes etc.; technical and professional colleges include engineering colleges, medical colleges, para-medical institutes, management colleges, teachers training and nursing training colleges, law colleges, art colleges, music colleges etc. Special and non-formal education centres include sishu siksha kendras, madhyamik siksha kendras, centres of Rabindra mukta vidyalaya, recognised Sanskrit tols, institutions for the blind and other handicapped persons, Anganwadi centres, reformatory schools etc.

Educational institutions
The following institutions are located in Khatra subdivision:
Panchmura Mahavidyalaya at Panchmura was established in 1965.
Khatra Adibasi Mahavidyalaya was established at Khatra in 1979.
Pandit Raghunath Murmu Smriti Mahavidyalaya was established at Baragari, PO Jambani in 1986.
Raipur Block Mahavidyalaya located at Village and PO Kharigerya was established in 2010.
Birsha Munda Memorial College was established in 2010 at Village Pirrah, PO Haludkanali.
Government General Degree College, Ranibandh has been started in 2015 at Rautara.
Simlapal College of Education at Simlapal offers courses leading to the Bachelor of Education degree. It was established in 2009 and affiliated to the University of Burdwan in 2012.

Healthcare
The table below (all data in numbers) presents an overview of the medical facilities available and patients treated in the hospitals, health centres and sub-centres in 2014 in Bankura district.

Medical facilities
Medical facilities in Khatra subdivision are as follows:

Hospitals: (Name, location, beds) 

Khatra Subdivisional Hospital, Khatra, 100 beds

Rural Hospitals: (Name, CD block, location, beds) 
Taldangra Rural Hospital, Taldangra CD block, Taldangra, 30 beds
Indpur Rural Hospital, Indpur CD block, Indpur, 30 beds

Block Primary Health Centres: (Name, CD block, location, beds)

Simla Block Primary Health Centre, Khatra CD block, Khatra, 10 beds

Primary Health Centres : (CD block-wise)(CD block, PHC location, beds)

Khatra CD block: Bonabaid (Kankradara) (10)
Hirbandh CD block: Mosiara (Dharampur) (4), Molian (Shyamnagar) (10)
Ranibandh CD block: Jhilimili (10), Barikul (2), Halud Kanali (6), Khejuria (6)
Taldangra CD block: Harmasra (6), Amdanga (Sabrakon) (10), Panchmura (6), Bibarda (2)
Simlapal CD block: Hatibari (Bon Dubrajpur) (4), Lakshmisagar (Rasikpur) (10), Arrah (6)
Raipur CD block: Matgoda (6), Phulkusma (10)
Sarenga CD block: Dumurtor (Tikarpara) Sarenga (6), Krishnapur (Dumurtor) (10)
Indpur CD block: Hatgram (4), Gunnath (6), Saldiha (10)

Electoral constituencies
Lok Sabha (parliamentary) and Vidhan Sabha (state assembly) constituencies in Bankura district were as follows:

References

Subdivisions of West Bengal
Subdivisions in Bankura district
Bankura district